A New World is an EP by Ronnie Drew, produced by Phil Coulter. It was released through the Sunday World newspaper prior to the release of Drew's album There's Life In The Old Dog Yet in October 2006.  As well as the title track from the forthcoming album, the EP also featured Drew's interpretations of several of Coulter's own compositions, many of which had previously been recorded by other artists.  All of the recordings were new except for "Take Me Home", which features The Dubliners and which originally appeared on Phil Coulter's 1989 album Words & Music.

Track listing
"There's Life in the Old Dog Yet"
"Donegal Danny"
"Gold and Silver Days"
"Yesterday's Men"
"Says She"
"Home from the Sea"
"Molly Malone"
"Take Me Home"

"There's Life In The Old Dog Yet" taken from the upcoming Ronnie Drew Album
All tracks published by Four Seasons Music and written by Phil Coulter (except “Molly Malone” trad—arranged Phil Coulter)Arranged and produced by Phil Coulter

Ronnie Drew albums
2006 EPs
albums produced by Phil Coulter